Hertz is an Anglicized name of German origin, with 'herz' literally meaning 'heart' in English. This alternate spelling of 'Herz' with an additional 't' primarily arose during the 19th and 20th Centuries as German-speaking immigrants travelled to English-dominant regions like North America. 'Hertz' was easier to pronounce in English, and approximated the proper German pronuonciation of the word. It is primarily a surname but it has also been used as a given name. Notable people with the name include:

Surname
 Alfred Hertz (1872–1942), German musician
 Arne Hertz (born 1939), Swedish racer
 Carl Hertz (1859–1924), American performer 
 Carl Hellmuth Hertz (aka Carl Helmut Hertz) (1920–1990), German-born medical researcher
 Carmen Hertz (born 1945), Chilean lawyer and politician
 Fanny Hertz (1830–1908), German-born British educationalist and feminist
 Garnet Hertz (born 1973), Canadian artist, designer and academic
 Gustav Ludwig Hertz (1887–1975), German physicist 
 Heinrich Rudolf Hertz (1857–1894), German physicist and namesake of the scientific unit of frequency
 Henrik Hertz (1797–1870), Danish writer
 Henry L. Hertz (1847-1926), American politician
 John Hertz (disambiguation), multiple people, including:
John D. Hertz (1879–1961), American businessman
John H. Herz (1908–2005), American political scientist
John Hertz (fan), American attorney and science fiction fan
 Joseph Hertz (1872–1946), Hungary-born religious leader and Chief Rabbi of the United Kingdom
 Judah Hertz, American real estate investor
 Noreena Hertz (born 1967), British economist
 Peter Hertz (1874–1939), Danish art historian and museum worker
 Robert Hertz (1881–1915), French sociologist
 Rosanna Hertz, American sociologist
 Saul Hertz (1905–1950), American physician
 Steve Hertz (disambiguation), multiple people, including:
Steve Hertz (baseball coach) (born 1950), former head baseball coach of the UC Irvine Anteaters and Gonzaga Bulldogs
Steve Hertz (third baseman), American baseball player and coach
 Wilhelm Hertz (1835–1902), German writer
 Yaëla Hertz (1930–2014), Israeli-Canadian teacher

Given name
 Hertz Grosbard (1892−1994), reciter of Yiddish literature

See also
Heartz (surname)
Herz (surname)
Hurtz (surname)
 

German-language surnames
Jewish surnames